"Désolé" (English: "Sorry") is a song by British virtual band Gorillaz featuring Malian singer Fatoumata Diawara. The track was released on 27 February 2020 as the second single for Gorillaz' seventh studio album, Song Machine, Season One: Strange Timez. The song is part of the Song Machine project, which is a web series involving the ongoing release of various Gorillaz tracks featuring different guest musicians over the course of 2020.

Music video

The video, directed by Jamie Hewlett, Tim McCourt, and Max Taylor, was filmed at Lake Como in Italy and mainly features band members 2-D, Noodle and Russel Hobbs boating with Diawara and Gorillaz co-creator Damon Albarn after having been transported to the lake via a portal inside Kong Studios, the band's fictional headquarters. Throughout the video, virtual bassist Murdoc Niccals can be seen inside Kong Studios, attempting and failing to cross the portal.

Release
In a press release, fictional band member Russel said of the song's recording: "Making 'Désolé' with Fatou was a real moment for me, you know. She's an African Queen. This lady made the song what it is, beautiful, like life. What can I say about 'Désolé'? They say sorry is the hardest word, but that's not true... Try saying antidisestablishmentarianism with a mouth full of gluten-free cronuts on a speed boat without licking your lips."

Tracklist

Personnel
Gorillaz
 Damon Albarn – vocals, instrumentation, director, keyboards, bass, guitar, drum programming
 Jamie Hewlett – artwork, character design, video direction
 Remi Kabaka Jr. – percussion

Additional musicians & personnel
 Fatoumata Diawara – vocals
 Voice Messengers – backing vocals
 James Ford – keyboards, percussion, balafon, drums, zither
 Davide Rossi – strings, string arranger
 Alice Pratley – violin
 Ciara Ismail – violin
 Izzi Dunn – cello
 Nicola Hicks – viola
 Sébastien Blanchon – horn
 Adrien Libmann – engineering
 Andrea Fognini – engineering
 Davide Lasala – engineering
 John Davis – mastering engineer
 Nora Fedrigo – engineering
 Samuel Egglenton – engineering
 Stephen Sedgwick – mixing engineer, engineering
 Sylvain Mercier – engineering

Charts

Notes

References

2019 songs
2020 singles
Gorillaz songs
Songs written by Damon Albarn
Parlophone singles
Warner Records singles
Songs written by James Ford (musician)
Songs written by Remi Kabaka Jr.
British contemporary R&B songs
Bossa nova songs
Song Machine